A Very Backstreet Christmas is the tenth (ninth in the United States) studio album and the first Christmas album by the Backstreet Boys. Initially slated for release in 2021, it was delayed due to the COVID-19 pandemic and was released on October 14, 2022. It entered the Billboard Top Holiday Albums chart at number 1, and debuted at number 17 on the Billboard 200 chart.

Background
On April 8, 2019, the Backstreet Boys announced they would release a Christmas album. On an appearance on Watch What Happens Live! in February 2020, the Backstreet Boys reaffirmed that it was coming out, saying that they were negotiating with their record label. However, due to COVID-19, they could not begin production, and the album was delayed until 2021.

With their DNA World Tour postponed due to the COVID-19 pandemic, the Backstreet Boys started working on their first Christmas album in March 2021, and began recording on May 5, 2021. On July 12, they officially announced their return to Las Vegas for a holiday residency scheduled for November and December 2021. On August 11, Kevin announced they had finished recording vocals for a "top secret project," believed to be the Christmas album. On August 14, band member Nick Carter revealed that they had finished recording the album and had done a photo shoot for the album cover. However, due to the COVID-19 pandemic, the album failed to meet the production deadline, forcing them to reschedule the album to release in late 2022. The band also canceled their 2021 holiday residency in Las Vegas. The Backstreet Boys took inspiration from many artists while working on the album, such as Michael Bublé and Mariah Carey, with one of the original songs, "Happy Days," being inspired by former *NSYNC member Justin Timberlake's "Can't Stop The Feeling."

A special edition of the album with two exclusive tracks, "Feliz Navidad" and "It's Christmas Time Again," was released exclusively at Target. In the winter of 2022, the group has planned numerous events to promote the album, such as appearances at the iHeartRadio Jingle Balls, and plans to host J.C. Penney's Holiday Spectacular on December 1, where the music video for the second single off the album will be released.

Singles
The first single from the album, "Last Christmas," was released on September 6 and is set to be accompanied by an official video release on November 1. The single peaked at number one on the Billboard Adult Contemporary chart. Songwriter Gary Baker announced in an interview that one of the songs he wrote for the album "Christmas in New York" would be the next second single with a brand new music video premiere in claymation.

Track listing

Charts

Release history

References

2022 Christmas albums
Backstreet Boys albums
RCA Records Christmas albums
Pop Christmas albums
Albums postponed due to the COVID-19 pandemic